Claud Allister (born William Claud Michael Palmer, 3 October 1888 – 26 July 1970) was an English actor with an extensive film career in both Britain and Hollywood, where he appeared in more than 70 films between 1929 and 1955.

Life and career
He was born in London. After receiving his education at Felsted School in Essex, he began his career as a stockbroker's clerk in the City of London, but gave up a life in the Square Mile on deciding that he preferred the stage, upon which he made his début in 1910.

He toured England's repertory theatres playing minor parts up to the outbreak of World War I, when he was commissioned into the British Army as a subaltern, and saw active service with the Suffolk Regiment and the Machine Gun Corps. 

Post-war he returned to acting, appearing in the West End in Bulldog Drummond, and in 1924 went to America to perform on the stage there initially. In 1929 he made his film début in The Trial of Mary Dugan. In 1934 he appeared in the West End in the historical play Mary Read.

Allister died 26 July 1970 at Santa Barbara, California, aged 81.

Filmography

 The Trial of Mary Dugan (1929) - Henry James Plaisted
 Bulldog Drummond (1929) - Algy
 Charming Sinners (1929) - Gregson
 Three Live Ghosts (1929) - Spoofy
 In the Next Room (1930) - Parks (the butler)
 Slightly Scarlet (1930) - Albert Hawkins
 Such Men Are Dangerous (1930) - Fred Wyndham
 Murder Will Out (1930) - Alan Fitzhugh
 Ladies Love Brutes (1930) - Tailor
 The Czar of Broadway (1930) - Francis
 The Florodora Girl (1930) - Lord Rumblesham
 Monte Carlo (1930) - Prince Otto von Liebenheim
 Reaching for the Moon (1930) - Sir Horace Partington Chelmsford
 Captain Applejack (1931) - John Jason 
 Meet the Wife (1931) - Victor Staunton
 I Like Your Nerve (1931) - Archie Lester
 Platinum Blonde (1931) - Dawson – The Valet
 The Sea Ghost (1931) - Percy Atwater
 On the Loose (1931) - Mr. Loder's friend
 The Unexpected Father (1932) - Claude
 Two White Arms (1932) - Dr. Biggash
 Diamond Cut Diamond (1932) - Joe Fragson
 The Return of Raffles (1932) - Bunny
 The Midshipmaid (1932) - Chinley
 That's My Wife (1933) - Archie Trevor
 Excess Baggage (1933) - Col. Murgatroyd, RSVP
 Sleeping Car (1933) - Baron Delande
 The Private Life of Henry VIII (1933) - Cornell
 The Medicine Man (1933) - Hon. Freddie Wiltshire
 Those Were the Days (1934) - Capt. Horace Vale
 The Return of Bulldog Drummond (1934) - Algy Longworth
 The Lady Is Willing (1934) - Brevin
 The Private Life of Don Juan (1934) - The Duke, as Dukes Go
 Every Night at Eight (1935) - Mr. Vernon (uncredited)
 The Dark Angel (1935) - Lawrence Bidley
 Three Live Ghosts (1936) - Lord 'Spoofy' Brockton
 Dracula's Daughter (1936) - Sir Aubrey 
 Yellowstone (1936) - Guest with Monocole 
 Lady Luck (1936) - Briggs
 Let's Make a Night of It (1937) - Monty
 Bulldog Drummond at Bay (1937) - Algy Longworth
 Danger: Love at Work (1937) - Salesman
 The Awful Truth (1937) - Lord Fabian (uncredited)
 Kentucky Moonshine (1938) - Lord Boffingwell (uncredited)
 Men Are Such Fools (1938) - Rudolf
 Blond Cheat (1938) - Lord Basil Sheldon (uncredited)
 Storm Over Bengal (1938) - Redding
 Arrest Bulldog Drummond (1939) - Sir Basil Leghorne
 Captain Fury (1939) - Suco
 Lillian Russell (1940) - Arthur Sullivan
 Pride and Prejudice (1940) - Mr. Beck (uncredited)
 The Reluctant Dragon (1941) - Sir Giles (voice)
 Charley's American Aunt (1941) - Cricket Match Spectator
 A Yank in the R.A.F. (1941) - Officer-Motorist (uncredited)
 Never Give a Sucker an Even Break (1941) - Bitten Englishman (uncredited)
 Confirm or Deny (1941) - William (scenes deleted)
 Don't Get Personal (1942) - Sir Cecil (uncredited)
 Forever and a Day (1943) - William Barstow
 The Hundred Pound Window (1944) - Hon. Freddie
 The Captain from Köpenick (completed in 1941, released in 1945), aka I Was a Criminal - First Railroad Employee
 Kiss the Bride Goodbye (1945) - Adolphus Pickering
 Don Chicago (1945) - Lord Piccadilly
 Gaiety George (1946) - Archie
 Quartet (1948) - 1st. Clubman (segment "The Colonel's Lady")
 The Adventures of Ichabod and Mr. Toad (1949) - Ratty (voice)
 Hong Kong (1952) - Hotel Manager
 Down Among the Sheltering Palms (1953) - Woolawei (uncredited)
 Kiss Me Kate (1953) - Paul
 The Black Shield of Falworth (1954) - Sir George

References

External links

1888 births
1970 deaths
Burials at Westwood Village Memorial Park Cemetery
Deaths from cancer in California
English male film actors
English expatriates in the United States
Male actors from London
20th-century English male actors
British expatriate male actors in the United States
British Army personnel of World War I
Suffolk Regiment officers
Machine Gun Corps officers